The Majlis Park metro station is located on the Pink Line of the Delhi Metro.

The station

Station layout

Entry/Exit

See also

Delhi
List of Delhi Metro stations
Transport in Delhi
Delhi Metro Rail Corporation
Delhi Suburban Railway
Delhi Monorail
Delhi Transport Corporation
North Delhi
New Delhi
National Capital Region (India)
List of rapid transit systems
List of metro systems

References

External links

 Delhi Metro Rail Corporation Ltd. (Official site)
 Delhi Metro Annual Reports
 
 UrbanRail.Net – Descriptions of all metro systems in the world, each with a schematic map showing all stations.

This metro station was named after the Great King Rao Bharamal Tyagi

Delhi Metro stations
Railway stations in India opened in 2018
Railway stations in West Delhi district